An allocution, or allocutus, is a formal statement made to the court by the defendant who has been found guilty prior to being sentenced. It is part of the criminal procedure in some jurisdictions using common law.

Concept 
An allocution allows the defendant to explain why the sentence should be lenient. In plea bargains, an allocution may be required of the defendant. The defendant explicitly admits specifically and in detail the actions and their reasons in exchange for a reduced sentence.

In principle, that removes any doubt as to the exact nature of the defendant's guilt in the matter.

The term "allocution" is used generally only in jurisdictions in the United States, but there are vaguely similar processes in other common law countries. In many other jurisdictions, it is for the defense lawyer to mitigate on their client's behalf, and the defendant rarely has the opportunity to speak.

The right of victims to speak at sentencing is also sometimes referred to as allocution.

Australia
In Australia, the term allocutus is used by the Clerk of Arraigns or another formal associate of the court. It is generally phrased as, "Prisoner at the Bar, you have been found Guilty by a jury of your peers of the offense of XYZ. Do you have anything to say as to why the sentence of this Court should not now be passed upon you?" The defense counsel will then make a plea in mitigation (also called submissions on penalty) in an attempt to mitigate the relative seriousness of the offense and heavily refer to and rely upon the defendant's previous good character and good works, if any.

The right to make a plea in mitigation is absolute. If a judge or magistrate refuses to hear such a plea or does not properly consider it, the sentence can be overturned on appeal.

United States
In most of the United States, defendants are allowed the opportunity to allocute before a sentence is passed. Some jurisdictions hold that as an absolute right. In its absence, a sentence but not the conviction may be overturned, resulting in the need for a new sentencing hearing. In the federal system, Federal Rules of Criminal Procedure 32(i)(4) provides that the court must "address the defendant personally in order to permit the defendant to speak or present any information to mitigate the sentence."

See also
 Confession (law)

References

Criminal procedure
Evidence law